Gebhard v Consiglio dell'Ordine degli Avvocati e Procuratori di Milano (1995) C-55/94 is an EU law case, concerning the freedom of establishment in the European Union.

Facts
A German lawyer called Mr Reinhard Gebhard from Stuttgart, lived in Milan, Italy. He called himself an "avvocato" and set up chambers to practice as a lawyer. He was suspended by the Milan Bar Council, because he had not been registered. Italian lawyers complained he used the title of 'avvocato' in his practice with mainly German customers in Milan.

Judgment
The Court of Justice held that it should be evaluated whether the Italian rules erected an obstacle to freedom of establishment.

See also

European Union law

Notes

References

Court of Justice of the European Union case law
1995 in case law